also released in arcades outside of Japan as Mega Force, is a vertical-scrolling shooter computer game released in 1984 by Tehkan.

Gameplay

In the game, the player pilots a starship called the Final Star, while shooting various enemies and destroying enemy structures for points.

Unlike later vertical scrolling shooters, like Toaplan's Twin Cobra, the Final Star had only two levels of weapon power and no secondary weapons like missiles and/or bombs. Each stage in the game was named after a letter of the Greek alphabet. In certain versions of the game, there is an additional level called "Infinity" (represented by the infinity symbol) which occurs after Omega, after which the game repeats indefinitely.

In the NES version, after defeating the Omega target, the player can see a black screen with Tecmo's logo, announcing the future release of the sequel Super Star Force. After that, the infinity target becomes available and the game repeats the same level and boss without increasing the difficulty.

Reception 
In Japan, Game Machine listed Star Force on its December 1, 1984, issue as the fourteenth most-successful table arcade unit at the time.

Legacy

Sequels
Super Star Force: Jikūreki no Himitsu, released in 1986 for the Japanese Nintendo Famicom.
Final Star Force, released for arcades in 1992.

Ports and related releases
Star Force was ported and published in 1985 by Hudson Soft to both the MSX home computer and the Family Computer (Famicom) in Japan. The North American version for the Nintendo Entertainment System (NES) was published in 1987 by Tecmo. Although the NES version is the same Hudson port that had been released for the Famicom in Japan, Tecmo made alterations to the graphics, music, and control, and increased the difficulty of the game.

Star Force was also ported to the SG-1000 by Sega, X68000 by Dempa Shimbunsha and mobile phones by Tecmo.

In 1995, along with two other NES shooters, the Famicom version of Star Force was remade by Hudson Soft with minimal upgrades for the Super Famicom as part of the Japan-only release of the Caravan Shooting Collection. The same version was also included in Hudson's compilation of NES shooters in 2006 in Hudson Best Collection Vol. 5.

The original arcade version was later added to the compilation titled Tecmo Classic Arcade, which was released for the Xbox. In 2009, the arcade version was made available for download on the Wii Virtual Console for 500 Wii Points as one of the four initial offerings for the "Virtual Console Arcade" category of the Wii Shop Channel (the other three being Gaplus, Mappy, and The Tower of Druaga from Namco).

In 1986, Hudson Soft released the shoot 'em up game Star Soldier, which is considered a spiritual successor to Star Force. The game spawned numerous sequels.

Notes

References

External links 
 
 Star Force at arcade-history

1984 video games
Arcade video games
Mobile games
MSX games
Nintendo Entertainment System games
Vertically scrolling shooters
SG-1000 games
X68000 games
Tecmo games
Video games developed in Japan
Virtual Console games
Vertically-oriented video games